Kirby D. Deater-Deckard is an American developmental psychologist who is Professor of Psychological & Brain Sciences at the University of Massachusetts Amherst, as well as director of the Healthy Development Initiative at the UMass Center in Springfield. He has been a fellow of the Association for Psychological Science since 2008.

References

External links
 Faculty page
 

21st-century American psychologists
American developmental psychologists
Fellows of the Association for Psychological Science
Living people
Pennsylvania State University alumni
University of Massachusetts Amherst faculty
University of Oregon faculty
University of Virginia alumni
Virginia Tech faculty
Year of birth missing (living people)